See also Westerville for similarly named places.

Westreville is an unincorporated community in Clay County, South Dakota, United States.

Latitude: 42.92417
Longitude: -97.02306
Elevation: 1309 ft

External links
Westreville at www.placenames.com

Unincorporated communities in Clay County, South Dakota
Unincorporated communities in South Dakota